Adams v. Robertson, 520 U.S. 83 (1997), was a United States Supreme Court case in which the court, in a per curiam opinion, "dismissed the writ of certiorari as improvidently granted."

Background
The defendant, Charlie Frank Robertson, filed a class action lawsuit in 1992, alleging that "Liberty National Life Insurance Company had fraudulently encouraged its customers to exchange existing health insurance policies for new policies" that provided an insubstantial amount of coverage for cancer treatment.  At trial, a settlement was agreed upon that precluded class members from individually suing Liberty National. However several of the people included in the class action lawsuit disagreed with the settlement. Guy E. Adams, the plaintiff in this case, was one of those people.

Question before the court
Does the Supreme Court of Alabama's approval of the settlement violate the Due Process Clause of the Fourteenth Amendment?

Decision of the Supreme Court
In a unanimous decision in favor of Robertson, the opinion of the court was written per curiam. The court dismissed the writ of certiorari and noted that the State Supreme Court "did not expressly address the question on which certiorari was granted." Further, the court found that the petitioners had "failed to establish that they had properly presented the issues to that court." The court concluded that it could not answer the question before the court because it would "unbalance" the US dual system of government.

References

External links
 

United States Supreme Court cases
United States Supreme Court cases of the Rehnquist Court
1997 in United States case law